Black's Medical Dictionary (42nd ed, 2010) is a comprehensive medical dictionary featuring definitions of medical terms, concepts and conditions, published by A & C Black Publishers. It was first published in 1906, and is now in its forty-second edition. It is considered a simplified home reference for medical terms. According to the publisher, It contains over 5000 definitions and descriptions of medical terms and concepts with over 1000 diagrams.

The latest edition contains new and expanded sections on:
 HPV vaccine
 Monoclonal Antibodies
 Fibroid treatment
 Endoscopy and laparoscopy
 Coronary angioplasty
 MRSA and stem cell research

On April 1, 2010, Bloomsbury Academic & Professional became the new U.S. publisher of A&C Black titles. Distribution continues through Macmillan Publishers.

List of editors
John Dixon Comrie
1906 (1st edition) – 1942 (17th edition)
H. A. Clegg
1944 (18th edition)
W. A. R. Thomson
1948 (19th edition) – 1984 (34th edition)
C. W. H. Havard
1987 (35th edition) – 1990 (36th edition)
Gordon MacPherson
1992 (37th edition) – 2002 (40th edition)
Harvey Marcovitch
2005 (41st edition) -

References

1906 non-fiction books
Medical dictionaries
A & C Black books